Edward Hearn or Hearne may refer to:

Edward Hearn (rugby league), Australian rugby league footballer of the 1940s and 1950s
Edward L. Hearn (1866–1945), Supreme Knight of the Knights of Columbus
Edward Hearn (actor) (1888–1963), American actor, frequently credited as Edward or Ed Hearn
Ed Hearn (baseball) (born 1960), baseball catcher
Ed Hearne (1887–1952), baseball shortstop
Eddie Hearne (1887–1955), American racecar driver